Carlo von Erlanger (5 September 1872 – 4 September 1904) was a German ornithologist and explorer born in Ingelheim am Rhein. He was a cousin to musicologist Rodolphe d'Erlanger (1872-1932). (See: Erlanger family tree).

He studied ornithology at the University of Lausanne, and performed wildlife studies in the Tunisian desert from 1893 to 1897. On his return to Europe he continued his studies at Cambridge and Berlin. In 1900 and 1901 with Oscar Rudolph Neumann, he went to East Africa (what is now Ethiopia and Somalia) and investigated and collected many thousands of insect and avian specimens. Erlanger died in an automobile accident in Salzburg on 4 September 1904, one day shy of his 32nd birthday.

Erlanger is credited with naming 40 new ornithological taxa, and has several zoological species named after him, such as:
Erlanger's lark, Calandrella erlangeri
Ptychadena erlangeri, an Ethiopian frog
Bofa erlangeri , an Ethiopian snake
Erlanger’s gazelle, Gazella erlangeri
His name is also associated with the subspecies Madoqua saltiana erlangeri Neumann, 1905.

Written works
Eine ornithologische Forschungsreise durch Tunesien (1898)
Meine Reise durch Sud-Schoa, Galla und die Somal-Lander (1902)
Forschungsreise durch Sud-Schoa, Galla und die Somali-lander. Beitrage zur Vogelfauna Nordostafrikas, mit besonderer Berucksichtigung der Zoogeographie (1904)

References

1872 births
1904 deaths
People from Ingelheim am Rhein
People from Rhenish Hesse
German ornithologists
German explorers
German people of Jewish descent
Carlo